Cotopaxi is an active stratovolcano in the Andes Mountains, located in Latacunga city of Cotopaxi Province, about  south of Quito, and  northeast of the city of Latacunga, Ecuador. Cotopaxi is among the highest active volcanoes in the world. Its most recent eruption began on 14 August 2015, and ended on 24 January 2016.

Cotopaxi is known to have erupted 87 times, resulting in the creation of numerous valleys formed by lahars (mudflows) around the volcano.  The last eruption lasted from August 2015 to January 2016. Cotopaxi was officially closed by the authorities to climbing until it reopened on October 7, 2017.

Description

On a clear day, Cotopaxi is clearly visible on the skyline from Latacunga and Quito. It is part of the chain of volcanoes around the Pacific plate known as the Pacific Ring of Fire. The crater consists of two concentric crater rims, the outer one being partly free of snow and irregular in shape. The crater interior is covered with ice cornices and rather flat. The highest point is on the outer rim of the crater on the north side.

History

Name
According to locals who speak Quechua, coto means 'neck' and paxi means 'moon' (Quechua q'oto 'throat' + Aymara phakhsi 'moon'). This refers to the crater of Cotopaxi that looks like a crescent moon. The mountain was honored as a sacred mountain by local Andean people, even before the Inca invasion in the 15th century. It was worshiped as rain sender, which served as the guarantor of the land's fertility, and at the same time its summit was revered as a place where gods lived.

Historic eruptions
With 87 known eruptions, Cotopaxi is one of Ecuador's most active volcanoes. The first recorded eruption of Cotopaxi was in 1534. This eruption appears to have deposited an ash layer in the lakes of El Cajas National Park that has been dated to 450±70  cal BP.

Cotopaxi's most violent eruptions in historical times occurred in the years 1742, 1744, 1768, and 1877. The 1744 and 1768 events destroyed the colonial town of Latacunga. During the June 26, 1877 eruption, pyroclastic flows descended on all sides of the mountain melting the entire ice cap, with lahars traveling more than  into the Pacific Ocean and western Amazon basin draining the valley. The city of Latacunga was again leveled completely due to the mudslide deposits.

The eruption on 19 June 1742 was witnessed by the scientists Pierre Bouguer and Charles-Marie de La Condamine, members of the French Geodesic Mission, as they descended from nearby Guagua Pichincha.

There was a major eruption from 1903 to 1904, and minor activity persisted until at least 1940 and possibly 1942.  (Note that direct observations of minor eruptions can be difficult because of bad weather, hence the uncertainty about the 1942 "eruption.")  The same source also reported increased thermal/seismic, non-eruptive activity in 1975 and 2002. In the increased activity of 2002, fumarolic activity and sulfuric emissions increased and ice around the inside and on the southeastern side of the cone started to melt.  However, no actual eruption was observed.

In 2015, two large phreatic (steam) eruptions on the morning of August 14 marked a new phase of volcanic activity. The volcano "remains in a very abnormal situation. The government estimates some 300,000 people are at risk from the volcano in the provinces of Cotopaxi, Tungurahua, Napo and Pichincha.

Climbing
In 1858 Moritz Wagner investigated the mountain, but he could not reach the summit either.

On November 28, 1872, German geologist Wilhelm Reiss and his Colombian partner, Angel Escobar, finally reached the summit of Cotopaxi.

In 1873 it was summitted by German Geologist Moritz Alphons Stübel and four Ecuadorians, Rafael Jantui, Melchor Páez, Vicente Ramón and Eusebio Rodriguez.

In 1880 British mountaineer Edward Whymper and the Italian guides Jean-Antoine Carrel and Louis Carrel made the third recorded ascent of Cotopaxi and spent a night on the summit.

Painters  and Hans Meyer reached the summit in 1903, and many of Reschreiter's paintings feature a view of Cotopaxi.

In the late 20th century, summiting Cotopaxi became a major tourist draw.

A tragedy occurred here on Easter Sunday 1996 when an avalanche partially buried the Refuge and dozens of tourists. The glacier above the Refuge was probably weakened by an earthquake that had shaken the entire Province of Cotopaxi for several days prior to the avalanche. In the warm midday sun a huge portion of the ice wall broke loose. Being Easter, there were many day visitors on the mountain who were buried in the ice and snow. Those trapped in the Refuge broke windows on the downhill side to climb to safety, but 13 people died on the slope above. The Refuge itself is located in a valley and consequently vulnerable to future avalanches.

Today

Recreation
Climbing Cotopaxi to the summit is quite popular, with up to 100 climbers attempting it on weekends. Today, mountain guide companies offer regular guided climbs of the mountain. Climbers grade the conventional route alpine PD (Peu Difficile) or WS (Wenig Schwierig) — or PD/WS+ (indicating "Mildly Difficult PLUS"). Use of crampons and ice axes is mandatory as snow and ice slopes of up to 50 degrees (1 in 2) are encountered, and climbers should be on belay and use aluminum ladders to cross one or two of the crevasses. A 4WD track goes up from the national park entrance to a carpark at  altitude on north side, just below the José F. Ribas Refuge. Here climbers can spend the night and begin their summit bid in the early morning without any intermediate camps. (Typically no more than about half of those attempting to summit Cotopaxi make it to the top after a daunting — though non-technical — six-hour scramble.) Summiting normally starts around 12:30 am, to reach the summit at latest 7:30 am and then return to the hut before the snow melts and glacier crevasses move/evolve. As of July 28, 2014, the Ribas Refuge is under construction. Tour operators shuttle their clients up to the top of the 4WD track once in the afternoon for a glacier skills class, and then again to start the climb around midnight, spending the intervening hours eating dinner and resting at a hostel lower down by the lakes. Adventure tourism operators in Quito also offer mountain biking tours from the Refuge downhill along the dirt track.

Recent activity
In April 2015, the volcano began to show signs of unrest, and came back to life. There was a large increase in earthquakes (including harmonic tremors) and SO2 emissions. IGEPN reported slight deformation of the edifice, suggesting an intrusion of magma under the volcano. As of 25 July, the unrest continued, and the most recent significant eruption was a phreatic (ash and steam) eruption that occurred on August 14 and 15, 2015. Ash was deposited heavily in areas close to the volcano, including damaging farmlands on the flanks of neighbouring volcanoes such as El Corazon, and thinly as far as Quito, affecting southern and central areas of the city. An eruption beginning in October 2022 is ongoing as of February 2023.

Future Cotopaxi eruptions pose a high risk to the local population, their settlements and fields. The main danger of a significant eruption of Cotopaxi would be the flash-melting of its summit glacier, resulting in devastating lahars which would travel down the flanks of the volcano, guided by river valleys whose origins lie at the volcano. Danger from normal, explosive eruptive activity is limited to within Cotopaxi National Park. However, the great distances that lahars of the significant size that Cotopaxi's glacier produces could travel greatly increase the hazard areas to include all river valleys leading from the volcano. If there were to be a very large explosion, it would destroy many northerly settlements within the valley in the suburban area of Quito (pop. more than 2,000,000). Another city which would be in great danger is the regional capital Latacunga, which is located in the south valley, and has been destroyed at least twice in recent history (1768, 1877) by lahars caused by volcanic activity.

In art
 Cotopaxi is commonly depicted in the traditional paintings of the indigenous people of Tigua, as the volcano holds significant cultural value.

 Cotopaxi was the subject of important works by painter Frederic Edwin Church in 1855 and 1862.
 In The Star (1897), a short story by H. G. Wells, Cotopaxi erupts with a tumult of lava that reaches the coastline in a day.
 In the poem Romance ("Chimborazo, Cotopaxi....Popocatapetl")  by Walter J. Turner (1916), Cotopaxi is one of the romantic locations that has stolen the poet's heart.
 In Shadrach in the Furnace (1976), a science fiction novel by Robert Silverberg, an eruption by Cotopaxi becomes known as "the night of Cotopaxi". It starts a series of disasters and uprisings that establish in the early 21st century a world dictatorship by the Mongolian Genghis Mao.
 In the American film Close Encounters of the Third Kind (1977), the SS Cotopaxi, a ship named Cotopaxi that disappeared in 1925, appears in the Gobi Desert. 
 American rock band The Mars Volta have a 2009 song named after the mountain.

See also

List of volcanoes in Ecuador
List of volcanic eruptions by death toll

References

External links

 
 

Stratovolcanoes of Ecuador
Active volcanoes
Andean Volcanic Belt
Subduction volcanoes
Glaciers of Ecuador
18th-century volcanic events
19th-century volcanic events
20th-century volcanic events
Holocene stratovolcanoes
Quaternary South America
Five-thousanders of the Andes
Climbing areas of Ecuador